Roy Rudolf Romer (born October 31, 1928) is an American politician who served as the 39th Governor of Colorado from 1987 to 1999, and subsequently as the superintendent of the Los Angeles Unified School District from 2000 to 2006.

Family and education
Romer was born in Garden City, Kansas, the son of Margaret Elizabeth (Snyder) and Irving Rudolph Romer. He grew up in the southeastern Colorado town of Holly. Romer received a bachelor's degree in agricultural economics from Colorado State University in 1950, where he served for one year as President of the Associated Students of Colorado State University. He later received a law degree from the University of Colorado School of Law in 1952. He also studied ethics for one year at Yale Divinity School, and was a legal officer in the U.S. Air Force. He and his wife, Bea, have seven children, 19 grandchildren, and three great-grandchildren. His son Paul Romer is a Nobel Prize winning economist, and another son Chris Romer was elected to a Colorado State Senate seat from Denver in November 2006.

Early professional activities
In the 1950s and 1960s, Romer was an attorney in Denver. He was also active in the management of his family's agricultural operations throughout Colorado.

Political career

Colorado state government

Romer served in the Colorado House of Representatives from 1958 to 1962 and in the Colorado Senate from 1962 to 1966. In 1966, Romer unsuccessfully challenged Republican U.S. Senator Gordon Allott.

Romer was Colorado State Treasurer from 1977 to 1987 (winning re-election to full four-year terms in 1978 and 1982), and a member of the governor's cabinet. Romer was first elected as governor in 1986, and re-elected in 1990 and 1994; he was the second Colorado governor to serve three terms. In 1997, Romer, along with Utah Governor Michael O. Leavitt and Wyoming Governor Jim Geringer, led a bipartisan team of 19 state governors in the founding of Western Governors University.

National political positions
Romer chaired the Democratic Governors Association in 1991. In 1992, he was co-chairman of the Democratic National Platform Committee. Romer served as national vice chair of the Democratic Leadership Council, and was a national co-chairman of the Clinton-Gore '96 campaign. In January 1997, Romer was elected to serve as general chairman of the Democratic National Committee.

From 1992 to 1993, Romer served as chair of the National Governors Association. In 1994–1995 he chaired the Education Commission of the States, and in 1995, was part of a bipartisan effort by the nation's governors to reform Medicaid.

Romer v. Evans
In law, his name is associated with the anti-discrimination suit Romer v. Evans that was brought to the Supreme Court during his tenure as Governor of Colorado. Though he was opposed to the amendment to the Constitution of Colorado in question, he defended the law in state and federal court in his position as Governor during litigation.  The Supreme Court ultimately ruled against the state's defense of Amendment 2, that it had “a rational relationship to legitimate state interests".   The Court then invalidated Amendment 2 under the due process clause of the Fourteenth Amendment of the Federal Constitution.  The state ultimately failed to give a "rational basis" to the purpose of the law.  The case did not go as far to ruling that gays and lesbians are protected as intermediate or strict scrutiny under the Fourteenth Amendment and left that question to lower federal and state courts to decide.

Romer v. Grant
In October 2004, Roy Romer and the Los Angeles Unified School District filed suit in the United States District Court, Central District of California against David Grant, a former student of the Los Angeles Unified School District. The suit cited false endorsement of the Lanham Act, violation of the Can-Spam Act, California Statutory Cyber Piracy, violation of the right of publicity under California statutory and common law, and California statutory unfair competition.

The lawsuit alleged David Grant attempted to lure the district's 700,000 students to a pornographic website. Roy Romer and the Los Angeles Unified School District subsequently settled the suit by paying Grant $360,000.00 in exchange for the domain name royromer.com.

Professional activities
On June 7, 2000, he became Superintendent of the Los Angeles Unified School District, where he served for six years. On October 12, 2006, the Los Angeles Board of Education unanimously named David L. Brewer III as his successor.

On April 25, 2007, Roy Romer began his service as the chairman and lead spokesman for Strong American Schools, a nonprofit project responsible for running Ed in 08, an information and initiative campaign funded by the Bill and Melinda Gates Foundation and the Eli and Edythe Broad foundation, aimed at encouraging 2008 presidential contenders to include education in their campaign policies.

Honors and awards
In 2008, a middle school in Los Angeles was named after him and it was first opened to students in September of that year.

References

 Colorado State Archives
 National Governor's Association
 The Political Graveyard

External links
 

|-

|-

|-

|-

|-

|-

|-

|-

|-

1928 births
American Presbyterians
Colorado lawyers
Democratic Party Colorado state senators
Colorado State University alumni
Democratic National Committee chairs
Democratic Party governors of Colorado
Living people
Los Angeles Unified School District superintendents
Democratic Party members of the Colorado House of Representatives
People from Garden City, Kansas
People from Prowers County, Colorado
State treasurers of Colorado
United States Air Force officers
University of Colorado Boulder alumni
Western Governors University people
Yale University alumni
Military personnel from Kansas
Military personnel from Colorado